Iglesia de Santa María la Real y Antigua de Gamonal is a church in Burgos, Spain. The Gothic structure dates to the 14th century, although there is evidence of an earlier church dating back to the eleventh century, when King Alfonso VI moved his seat from the destroyed city of Oca of the Auca diocese in 1075. It became a Bien de Interés Cultural listed building on 3 June 1931.

References

Roman Catholic churches in Burgos
Bien de Interés Cultural landmarks in the Province of Burgos
11th-century Roman Catholic church buildings in Spain
14th-century Roman Catholic church buildings in Spain